Sandra Hazel Bailie  (born 1960) is a Northern Irish international lawn and indoor bowler.

Bowls career

Outdoor career
In 2009, she won the fours bronze medal at the Atlantic Bowls Championships and in 2015 she won the triples gold medal at the Atlantic Bowls Championships.

She won the 2016 (pairs), 2012 & 2016 (triples) and 2008, 2011 & 2014 fours titles at the Irish National Bowls Championships bowling for the Knock Bowls Club.

In 2016, she was selected as part of the Northern Ireland team for the 2018 Commonwealth Games on the Gold Coast in Queensland.

In 2022, Bailie won her seventh national title while bowling for NI Civil Service. She won the pairs with Alison Morris.

Indoor career
Bailie reached the final of the mixed pairs during the 2022 World Indoor Bowls Championship losing to Paul Foster and Alison Merrien.

Honours and awards
Bailie was voted Belfast Sports Personality of the Year in 2017

She was appointed Member of the Order of the British Empire (MBE) in the 2023 New Year Honours for services to bowls.

References

1960 births
Living people
Female lawn bowls players from Northern Ireland
Bowls players at the 2018 Commonwealth Games
Commonwealth Games competitors for Northern Ireland
Members of the Order of the British Empire